

Venues

Squads
Source:

France
Marc Ambert (Pia)
Manuel Caravaca (Carcassonne)
Delphin Castanon (Lézignan)
Max Chantal (Villeneuve-sur-Lot)
Philippe Fourquet (Villeneuve-sur-Lot)
José Giné (Roanne)
Ivan Grésèque (XIII Catalan)
Hervé Guiraud (Lézignan)
Christian Maccali (Villeneuve-sur-Lot)
José Moya (Carcassonne)
Michel Naudo (Pia)
Marcel Pillon (Saint-Estève)
Hugues Ratier (Lézignan)
Joël Roosebrouck (Villeneuve-sur-Lot) (Captain) 
Sébastien Rodriguez (Pia)
Jean-Pierre Trémouille (Tonneins)
Éric Waligunda (Lézignan)

England
Mick Adams
Brian Case
Len Casey
Des Drummond
George Fairbairn (Captain)
Steve Fenton
Roy Holdstock
John Joyner
Ken Kelly
Steve Nash
Steve Norton
Steve O'Neill
Bill Pattinson
Harry Pinner
Terry Richardson
Mike Smith
Ian Potter
Arnold Walker
David Ward
John Woods

Wales
John Bevan (Captain)
Harold Box
Adrian Cambriani
Steve Diamond
Colin Dixon
Clive Griffiths
Martin Herdman
Mel James
Brian Juliff
Roy Mathias
Gareth Owen
Roger Owen
Donald Parry
Paul Prendiville
Steve Rule
Trevor Skerrett
Graham Walters
Danny Wilson
Paul Woods

Results

Final standings

References

External links
1981 European Rugby League Championship at rugbyleagueproject.com
International rugby league competitions hosted by the United Kingdom
International rugby league competitions hosted by France
European Nations Cup
European rugby league championship